Edward Hale Leach (24 April 1883 - 19 February 1965) was an Australian rules footballer who played with Collingwood and Melbourne in the Victorian Football League (VFL).

Family
The son of Thomas Leach (1847-1916), and Emma Bunkin Leach (1847-1893), née Stuckey, Edward Hale Leach was born in Heidelberg, Victoria on 24 April 1883.

Wife
He married Amy Harriet Cougle (1880-1948) in 1904.

Brothers
His two brothers, Arthur Thomas Leach (1876–1948), and John Frederick "Fred" Leach (1878–1908) also played for Collingwood.

Death
He died (suddenly) at his home in Balwyn, Victoria on 19 February 1965.

Notes

External links 

 
 
 Ted Leach, Collingwood Forever.
 Ted Leach, The VFA Project.

1883 births
1965 deaths
Australian rules footballers from Melbourne
Collingwood Football Club players
Melbourne Football Club players
Collegians Football Club players
People from Heidelberg, Victoria